Greg Duhaime (August 11, 1953 – October 28, 1992) was a Canadian track and field athlete and one-time Canadian record holder in the 3000 metres steeplechase. He was born in Espanola, Ontario.

Duhaime is a four-time Canadian champion in the men's 3000 m steeplechase (1980-1982 and 1984), and a one-time national champion in the men's 5000 metres (1980).

Duhaime was one of many athletes to not compete in the 1980 Summer Olympics because of the 1980 Summer Olympics boycott against Moscow, they participated in the Liberty Bell Classic (an alternative meet for the Olympic Boycott) in Philadelphia instead. He won a bronze medal at the 1982 Commonwealth Games in the steeplechase. Duhaime was gay, and one of only a handful of openly gay Olympians at the time. He died of AIDS in 1992.

International competitions

See also
 Homosexuality in sports
 Politics and sports

References
 Canadian Olympic Committee

1953 births
1992 deaths
People from Espanola, Ontario
Track and field athletes from Ontario
Canadian male middle-distance runners
Canadian male steeplechase runners
Olympic track and field athletes of Canada
Athletes (track and field) at the 1984 Summer Olympics
Commonwealth Games bronze medallists for Canada
Commonwealth Games medallists in athletics
Athletes (track and field) at the 1982 Commonwealth Games
Pan American Games medalists in athletics (track and field)
Athletes (track and field) at the 1979 Pan American Games
Athletes (track and field) at the 1983 Pan American Games
Gay sportsmen
Canadian LGBT sportspeople
LGBT track and field athletes
AIDS-related deaths in Canada
Pan American Games bronze medalists for Canada
Medalists at the 1983 Pan American Games
20th-century Canadian LGBT people
Medallists at the 1982 Commonwealth Games
Canadian gay men